Cerastium tomentosum (snow-in-summer) is an herbaceous flowering plant and a member of the family Caryophyllaceae. It is generally distinguished from other species of its genus by "tomentose" or felty foliage. It is a low, spreading perennial native to alpine regions of Europe. The stems & leaves are silvery-grey, whilst the flowers are star-like, white & about 15mm across.

Description

It is an evergreen, creeping off-shoot, perennial, herbaceous plant that reaches heights of growth of 15 to 30 (rarely to 45) centimeters. It is overall densely hairy. The leaves are up to 30 millimetres long and linear to lanceolate, which are covered with silky, silvery, frizzy and entangled hairs, forming like whitish felting. The inflorescences consist of up to 15 flowers. The calyx is 5 to 7 millimetres long. The petals are white and twice as long as the calyx. The teeth of the capsule are slightly bent outwards. The flowering period is from May to July in the northern hemisphere,  but may also bloom at other times of the year.

Cultivation
It has proven popular as a cultivated ornamental and can be found in gardens the world over. It is a horticultural plant, perennial, rocky, forming dense silver carpets. This plant is not very demanding: it likes a poor soil, rich in gravel, well drained, in a sunny place. It spreads easily by its rhizomes.

Range
It is native to southern Italy. It is believed to originate from the Caucasus and southeastern Europe. It has naturalised in Canada, the United States and France, where it is often subspontaneous.

References

External links
Heritage Perennials: Cerastium tomentosum
Missouri Botanical Garden (Kemper Center): Cerastium tomentosum

tomentosum
Alpine flora
Flora of Europe
Flora of Estonia
Flora of the United Kingdom
Plants described in 1753
Taxa named by Carl Linnaeus